The 2019 Food City 300 is a NASCAR Xfinity Series race held on August 16, 2019, at Bristol Motor Speedway in Bristol, Tennessee. Contested over 300 laps on the  concrete short track, it was the 22nd race of the 2019 NASCAR Xfinity Series season.

Background

Track

Bristol Motor Speedway, formerly known as Bristol International Raceway and Bristol Raceway, is a NASCAR short track venue located in Bristol, Tennessee. Constructed in 1960, it held its first NASCAR race on July 30, 1961. Despite its short length, Bristol is among the most popular tracks on the NASCAR schedule because of its distinct features, which include steep banking, an all concrete surface, two pit roads, and stadium-like seating.

Entry list

Practice

First practice

Final practice

Qualifying

Qualifying results

Race

Summary
Austin Cindric started on pole. Early on in the race, Matt Mills (who was a lap down) squeezed Cole Custer into the wall as he and Christopher Bell battled within the top 5, sending Custer sliding into Bell. The two leaned into the following turn, where Erik Jones and Joey Logano were also collected and eliminated. On the restart, John Hunter Nemechek got a flat tire but saved the car. He spun again in front of Kyle Busch, who was nearly smashed into the outside wall. Justin Allgaier took the lead from Busch on lap 61.

Tyler Reddick later caught up to Allgaier, but made contact with him after driving too deep into the corner. Brandon Jones overtook Allgaier and Reddick after they both spun out (though Allgaier prevented his car from colliding into the wall) and won Stage 1.

In the beginning of Stage 2, Ronnie Bassett Jr. lost a wheel going into a turn in front of Busch and spun out, causing a red flag. Busch won the stage despite his engine struggling. His car's motor blew immediately after winning the stage, subsequently ending his day.

Michael Annett spun halfway into the final stage and brought out a caution. Allgaier strategically stayed out, while Reddick pitted. Ryan Sieg ran in second place but got into the wall and had a tire rub that forced him to pit and ultimately retire from the race. With 11 laps to go, Brandon Jones who was 2nd at the moment went to the outside wall. In the following lap, with 10 laps to go, Allgaier had a significant lead on Reddick, but he had a tire beginning to go down. Reddick benefited from this and overtook him, taking the victory over Chase Briscoe.

Stage Results

Stage One
Laps: 85

Stage Two
Laps: 85

Final Stage Results

Stage Three
Laps: 130

Notes

References

NASCAR races at Bristol Motor Speedway
Alsco 300 (Bristol)
Food City 300
2019 NASCAR Xfinity Series